The Erzurum Eyalet was an eyalet of the Ottoman Empire. It was established after the conquest of Western Armenia by the Ottoman Empire.

History
The eyalet was established in 1533. Early in the 17th century, the eyalet was threatened by Iran and the revolt by the province governor Abaza Mehmed Pasha. This revolt was combined with Jelali Revolts (the uprising of the provincial musketeers called the Celali), backed by Iran and lasted until 1628.

It was one of the first Ottoman provinces to become a vilayet after an administrative reform in 1865, and by 1867 it had been reformed into the Erzurum Vilayet.

Governors
 Köprülü Fazıl Ahmed (1659–1660)

Administrative divisions

References

Eyalets of the Ottoman Empire in Anatolia
Ottoman period in Armenia
History of Ağrı Province
History of Artvin Province
History of Bingöl Province
History of Bayburt Province
History of Erzincan Province
History of Erzurum Province
History of Tunceli Province
1533 establishments in the Ottoman Empire
1867 disestablishments in the Ottoman Empire